Eddie Leie (born 16 November 1986) is a South African former cricketer who played as a leg break bowler and right-handed batter. He has played for the South Africa A cricket team and was awarded a High Performance contract by Cricket South Africa in 2015. In August 2017, he was named in Benoni Zalmi's squad for the first season of the T20 Global League. However, in October 2017, Cricket South Africa initially postponed the tournament until November 2018, with it being cancelled soon after.

In September 2018, he was named in Free State's squad for the 2018 Africa T20 Cup. The following month, he was named in Jozi Stars' squad for the first edition of the Mzansi Super League T20 tournament. In September 2019, he was named in Gauteng's squad for the 2019–20 CSA Provincial T20 Cup.

International career
He made his Twenty20 International debut against Bangladesh on 7 July 2015. He took 3 wickets for 16 runs in the debut match and won the man of the match award.

References

External links 
 

1986 births
Living people
South African cricketers
South Africa Twenty20 International cricketers
Cape Cobras cricketers
Free State cricketers
Gauteng cricketers
Jozi Stars cricketers
Knights cricketers
Lions cricketers
Saint Lucia Kings cricketers